Baharan District is a district (bakhsh) in Gorgan County, Golestan Province, Iran. At the 2006 census, its population was 48,074, in 12,191 families.  The District has one city: Sarkhon Kalateh. The District has two rural districts (dehestans): Estarabad-e Shomali Rural District and Qoroq Rural District.

References 

Districts of Golestan Province
Gorgan County